Gabrielle Beryl Hollows  ( O'Sullivan; 21 May 1953) is an Australian orthoptist. An Australian Living Treasure, she was also given the Advance Australia Award for Community Service, and was made Paul Harris Fellow by Rotary International. She was married to the Australian ophthalmologist Fred Hollows from 1980 until his death in 1993.

Early life
Hollows was born in Newcastle, New South Wales, and raised on an orchard near Gosford on the Central Coast of New South Wales. She first became interested in medicine when she had eye surgery at the age of three.

Career
In 1972, she graduated as an orthoptist from the NSW School of Orthoptics, specialising in disorders of eye movements and associated vision problems. During her orthoptic training, she met Fred Hollows. and joined him on the National Trachoma and Eye Health Program, which aimed to survey and treat Aboriginal and Torres Strait Islander Australians across the country eye conditions including trachoma. Over a period of three years, they visited over 465 remote communities and treated more than 100,000 people. They married in 1980 and had five children. She worked with Fred until his death in 1993, and continued his work afterwards through The Fred Hollows Foundation, both overseas and in Australia. In 1996, she married lawyer John Balazs.

Awards and honours
In 2001, she was awarded the Centenary Medal for services to community welfare and development.

In the 2013 Queens Birthday Honours List, Gabi Hollows was made an Officer of the Order of Australia (AO) for "distinguished service to public health as an advocate for the eradication of blindness, particularly for Indigenous Australians and people in the developing world."

In the 2021 Impact 25 Awards, Gabi Hollows was named one of the top 25 Australians creating positive change. She was also awarded the Judge's Choice Award for Collaboration.

Footnotes

Sources
 Gabi Hollows - Founding Director - biography at The Fred Hollows Foundation website
 Gabi Hollows: a conversation - 27 May 2005 (abc.net.au)

External links
 The Fred Hollows Foundation website

1953 births
Living people
Australian ophthalmologists
Women ophthalmologists
Recipients of the Centenary Medal
Officers of the Order of Australia